Punjab Tractors was the first Indian company to indigenously manufacture agricultural tractors in India, aptly named as Swaraj – giving a new dimension to the concept of self-reliance put forth by MK Gandhi. The seeds of this organization were sown in Central Mechanical Engineering Research Institute (CMERI), Durgapur (West Bengal) in 1960s in the form of a design project, which later took the form of an organization in Mohali (Punjab).

Swaraj division is a tractor and farm equipment making company which is owned by Mahindra & Mahindra Ltd. Formerly known as Punjab Tractors Limited, the company was taken over by Mahindra Group in 2007 and subsequently in 2009, the name was changed to swaraj division.

History

It was in 1964 that the then Prime Minister of India, Pt. Jawaharlal Nehru invited Man Mohan Suri to join as Director of CMERI. In April 1965, on Suri's invitation, Chandra Mohan quit Indian Railways and joined CMERI. In August 1965, Man Mohan Suri accompanied Prime Minister Lal Bahadur Shastri’s delegation to Moscow as a technical expert and returned with the idea of manufacturing 20HP tractors for small farmers at a rate of around 12000 tractors per annum. In September 1965, a five-page proposal was submitted to Union Planning Commission (Subsequently changed to Niti Aayog) and the project was assigned.

Basic R&D and development of prototypes

The basic R&D began at CMERI in 1965. The core design team was around six young engineers, mostly fresh engineering graduates with limited knowledge of materials and processing. No one except Mr. Chandra Mohan was familiar with agricultural tractors.

In order to gain some insight, two tractors were bought for detailed study. Technical Inputs regarding product design were obtained from various sources, viz. Indian Patent Office, Kolkata and IIT Kharagpur (The only institute running PG course in Agricultural Engineering at that time).

The inputs regarding product specifications were obtained from sources such as Punjab Agricultural University, Ludhiana Agricultural University, Pantnagar (UP), and individual Farmers.

The basic product specifications worked out on the basis of inputs gathered from various sources included features such as automatic implement-control system, failure-proof working even in the hottest of summers, low-cost serviceability, and a concept of "Unified Series".

Realizing the importance of modular design right from the conceptualization phase, the design range was conceived as a unified series right from the beginning, by virtue of which, many major sub-assemblies as well as tooling were designed to be common across different tractor models. During the subsequent manufacturing stage, these concepts proved significantly valuable in bringing down the manufacturing costs and lead-times, while enhancing product reliability by relying on well-established modules and methods. The first prototype testing in 1967 proved to be a failure, but the team continued to improve their design, thereby gaining vital experience in the process.

Further investment in the project required political approval. Concerned over the idling public-sector investments of Rs. 40 Crore in MAMC (Mining & Allied Machinery Corporation), Durgapur, the Government decided to have MAMC as a 50:50 partner in development, so as to transform its idle capacity into productive one through a volume-produced product line and also utilize their expertise in design. Vital material and manufacturing support was also received from Britannia Engineering Co. of Calcutta, who was the manufacturer of road-rollers and had surplus production capacity, lying idle following the massive border road-building activity after the 1961 war against China. The prototypes successfully tested in field-trials in 1969 had all indigenous components but for four bearings. This was followed by mandatory evaluation by Tractor Training & Testing Centre, Budni (MP), and filing of patents.

Launch of Punjab Tractors Limited (PTL)

Punjab State Industrial Development Corporation (PSIDC) came forward for providing partial support for funds on the condition that the members of core design team resign from CMERI and come to Punjab for implementation, following which the work began in May 1970. Given unproven credentials, the team faced many challenges in procuring funds and approvals for the project. Owing to lack of manufacturing facilities, the manufacturing license had to be obtained on the basis of a temporary certification from National Certification Centre for Tractors, Budni (MP).

Milestones

 1972: Opening of the public issue
 1972: Construction at Mohali
 1974: Commencement of commercial production of Swaraj 724
 1974: FICCI Award
 1975: Unified design facilitates the company to launch Swaraj 735 within a few months. For many years, Swaraj 735 remained the single largest selling model in India.
 1975: Awarded the National Gold Shield for import substitution.
 1976: ASSOCHAM Award for ancillary promotion.
 1977: Expansion of Mohali plant
 1978: IMM Toshiba Gold Award for Marketing
 1979: Introduction of Swaraj 720.
 1980: Acquired Punjab Scooters Ltd. (Subsequently, transformed into Swaraj Automotives Ltd., Nabha)
 1980: Expansion of Mohali plant.
 1981: Setting-up of Swaraj Combine Division.
 1981: Setting-up of Swaraj Foundry Division.
 1982: Swaraj Harvester Combine rolls out.
 1983: Introduction of Swaraj 855: PTL's HP-range became broader than that of all competitors combined.
 1984: Incorporation of Swaraj Mazda Limited.
 1985: LCV's roll-out from Swaraj Mazda Ltd.
 1985: Padma Shri Award to Mr. Chandra Mohan
 1986: Incorporation of Swaraj Engines Ltd (SEL). SEL became another Blue Chip company within 10 years.
 1986: Introduction of Swaraj Forklifts.
 1987: Implementation of Dr. Juran's concepts for  management: 22 teams constituted.
 1990: QIMPRO Gold for TQM.
 1993: Mohali expansion to 24000 tractors per annum.
 1994: Tractor Plant in Swaraj Combine Division, Chapar Chiri, having a capacity of 12000 tractors per annum.
 1996: Expansion of Mohali plant to produce 30000 tractors per annum.
 1997: Expansion of Chapar Chiri plant to produce 30000 tractors per annum.
 1998: Introduction of Swaraj 922, Swaraj 722 and New Swaraj 855.
 1999: Introduction of Swaraj 744.
 2002: Cumulative sales cross 500,000 mark.
 2007: Mahindra & Mahindra acquires majority stake in Punjab Tractors Ltd.
 2009: Merger of PTL into M&M and subsequent transformation as the Swaraj Division of Mahindra & Mahindra Ltd.
 2011: Rated Highest In Industry for Customer Satisfaction Index (CSI), Sales Satisfaction Index (SSI) & CaPS
 2012: Swaraj becomes the second tractor company in the world to win the prestigious DEMING Prize
 2012: Rated Highest In Industry for Customer Satisfaction Index (CSI)
 2013: Swaraj Division Plant 1 and Plant 2 Won TPM Excellence Award From JIPM

Take-over by Mahindra & Mahindra Ltd.
Following disinvestment by the state government, Punjab Tractors Limited was eventually taken-over by Mahindra & Mahindra in 2007. This acquisition made Mahindra & Mahindra World's largest tractor manufacturer. Subsequent to this take-over, the former PTL was merged into M&M and transformed as Swaraj division of Mahindra & Mahindra in the year 2009. As of 2016, the division has over 2100 employees, a network of over 1500 sales/service centres and 600 dealerships across India, while the product portfolio comprises tractor models ranging from below 30HP to over 50HP power.

Beginning with 735XM and 843XM in 2009, the Swaraj division has since been standardizing on XM series of products. The company secured top rating in Customer Satisfaction Index and Sales Satisfaction Index; was awarded Deming Prize in the year 2012 and TPM Excellence Award from JIPM.

References

Companies based in Punjab, India
Indian brands
1972 establishments in Punjab, India
Indian companies established in 1972
Companies of India
Mahindra Group